The County of Canning is a county (a cadastral division) in Queensland, Australia. The county consists of almost all of the former Shires of Caboolture, Maroochy and Kilcoy and the former City of Caloundra. Its main urbanised areas are centred on the Sunshine Coast (excluding Noosa) and the areas surrounding Caboolture.

History
Canning was first created by an Order in Council by the Governor of New South Wales on 30 December 1848. It was named in honour of Sir George Canning, who had served as British Foreign Secretary and briefly as Prime Minister. The county was then described in the following terms:

On 7 March 1901, the Governor of Queensland proclaimed new boundaries under the Land Act 1897. The south boundary was altered from the 27th parallel to the Caboolture River while the north boundary was extended to the Shire of Noosa boundary.

Parishes 
Canning is divided into parishes, as listed below:

References

Canning